Revista de Biologia is a biannual peer-reviewed scientific journal covering research in biology, especially mediterranean and tropical ecology. It is published by the Botanical Garden of the University of Lisbon and was established in 1956. Until 1974, the journal was published jointly by the Botanical Gardens of Rio de Janeiro, Lisbon, Dundo, and Lourenço Marques. The editors-in-chief are Amélia Martins-Loução, Fernando Catarino, and Ireneia Melo.

External links

Biology journals
Publications established in 1956
Portuguese-language journals